Jagjit Singh (born 28 January 1997) is an Indian cricketer. He made his first-class debut on 11 January 2020, for Chandigarh in the 2019–20 Ranji Trophy. He made his Twenty20 debut on 15 January 2021, for Chandigarh in the 2020–21 Syed Mushtaq Ali Trophy. He made his List A debut on 21 February 2021, for Chandigarh in the 2020–21 Vijay Hazare Trophy.

References

External links
 

1997 births
Living people
Indian cricketers
Chandigarh cricketers
Place of birth missing (living people)